Igor Gluščević (born 30 March 1974) is a Montenegrin retired footballer who played as a striker.

Club career
Born in Budva, Socialist Republic of Montenegro, Socialist Federal Republic of Yugoslavia, Gluščević started his professional career with FK Vojvodina. After scoring seven goals in two seasons, he signed with Spanish club CF Extremadura: having featured sparingly as the team was relegated from La Liga in 1997, he netted 24 times for an immediate promotion back, being crowned the competition's top scorer.

However, Gluščević decided to stay in Segunda División, moving to Sevilla FC and being an important attacking element in the Andalusians' 1999 promotion. At the end of the campaign, he joined Aris F.C. in Greece on loan.

After another sole season, Gluščević signed for FC Utrecht, where he experienced his most prolific years which included winning the 2003 edition of the KNVB Cup, scoring twice in the final. After a brief spell with Sparta Prague he returned to the Netherlands, this time with Vitesse Arnhem, failing to find the net in his second year.

Having started 2006-07 in China with Shandong Luneng Taishan FC, Gluščević moved once again to Holland in January 2007, joining Heracles Almelo and being released at the end of the 2007–08 season, following which he retired at the age of 34.

Personal life
Gluščević's younger brother, Vladimir, was also a footballer and a forward. He too played with Mogren, Sparta Prague and in Spain. His son is Nikola Gluscevic, playing for Sevilla FC as striker

Honours
Utrecht
KNVB Cup: 2002–03

References

External links
 
 
 
 Stats at Voetbal International 

1974 births
Living people
People from Budva
Association football forwards
Serbia and Montenegro footballers
Montenegrin footballers
FK Mogren players
FK Vojvodina players
CF Extremadura footballers
Sevilla FC players
Aris Thessaloniki F.C. players
FC Utrecht players
AC Sparta Prague players
SBV Vitesse players
Shandong Taishan F.C. players
Heracles Almelo players
First League of Serbia and Montenegro players
La Liga players
Segunda División players
Super League Greece players
Eredivisie players
Czech First League players
Chinese Super League players
Serbia and Montenegro expatriate footballers
Expatriate footballers in Spain
Serbia and Montenegro expatriate sportspeople in Spain
Expatriate footballers in Greece
Serbia and Montenegro expatriate sportspeople in Greece
Expatriate footballers in the Netherlands
Serbia and Montenegro expatriate sportspeople in the Netherlands
Expatriate footballers in the Czech Republic
Serbia and Montenegro expatriate sportspeople in the Czech Republic
Montenegrin expatriate footballers
Expatriate footballers in China
Montenegrin expatriate sportspeople in China
Montenegrin expatriate sportspeople in the Netherlands